Middleton Cheney is a large village and civil parish in West Northamptonshire, England. The A422 road between Banbury and Brackley used to pass through Middleton Cheney, but now bypasses it to the south.

The 2011 Census recorded the parish's population (including Thenford) as 3,597.

Archaeology and history
The village's name means 'Middle farm/settlement'. The village was held by John de Chendut in the 12th century.

Traces of Neolithic, Bronze Age and Roman settlements have been found in the parish. An open field system of farming prevailed in the parish until the 18th century. Parliament passed an Inclosure Act for the parish in 1769 and the parish was surveyed for its inclosure awards in 1770. There is a row of 19th-century almshouses on the former main road through the village.

In 1847 Parliament passed a bill for the Buckinghamshire Railway to build an extension to Banbury. It was built through the south of Middleton Cheney parish, and Farthinghoe railway station was opened in the parish in 1851. It was in the southeast corner of the parish,  from the village, on the main road to Brackley. British Railways closed the station in 1952 and the railway in 1963.

The Holt was a house in the parish designed by William Wilkinson. It built in 1864 and demolished in 1973.

The parish used to include the village of Overthorpe, which is now a separate parish.

Churches

Church of England
The Church of England parish church of All Saints is early 14th-century Decorated Gothic. The windows have been renewed but the south doorway is original. The nave has a clerestory, north and south aisles and four-bay arcades. William Edington was Rector 1322–35. He was consecrated Bishop of Winchester in 1345.

The west tower and spire are later Medieval Perpendicular Gothic additions. In the 18th century the spire survived three lightning strikes: in 1720, 1794 and 1797.

All Saints was restored under the direction of George Gilbert Scott in 1865. During the restoration notable stained-glass windows were added that were designed by the Pre-Raphaelite artists William Morris, Philip Webb, Edward Burne-Jones, Ford Madox Brown and Simeon Solomon and made by Morris & Co. There are also mosaics made by James Powell and Sons, one of which was designed by Henry Holiday.

All Saints is now a Grade I listed building.

The west tower has a ring of six bells. Henry I Bagley of Chacombe cast four of them: the tenor in 1640, the second bell in 1659, the treble in 1671 and the third bell in 1680. James Keene, who had bell-foundries at Bedford and Woodstock, cast the fifth bell in 1651. Mears and Stainbank of the Whitechapel Bell Foundry cast the fourth bell in 1881.

All Saints' churchyard has a number of historic grave monuments. Four 17th-century English Baroque headstones and two 18th-century chest tombs are Grade II listed. The Horton family mausoleum is not listed, but is a Gothic Revival nomument designed by William Wilkinson and made by Thomas Earp in 1866–67.

All Saints is a member of the Chenderit Benefice, which includes the parishes of Chacombe, Greatworth, Marston St. Lawrence, Thenford and Warkworth.

Baptist
The Baptist congregation in Middleton Cheney may have been formed in 1740. The site of its original chapel is not known, but may have been in the Baptist burial ground in Queen Street. The present Baptist Centre was built as a chapel in 1806.

Methodist
A Methodist congregation was meeting in Middleton Cheney by 1802 and had a registered chapel by 1814. The present Methodist Church was built as a Wesleyan chapel in 1867. It is a member of the Banbury Circuit.

Local amenities

Middleton Cheney has a set of parish meeting rooms, public library, sub-post office, veterinary surgery, pharmacy, supermarket and cookery school. The village has two 18th-century pubs: The Dolphin Inn and The New Inn, plus a sports and social club.

Middleton has  a preschool as well as Middleton Cheney Primary Academy, a primary school for children between the ages of 4 and 11. Chenderit School is a secondary school that includes a sixth form.

Middleton Cheney has a set of playing fields. The village has clubs for cricket, football, karate and tennis. The football club's home ground is in Astrop Road and the first team play in the Oxfordshire Senior Football League. It has a junior section that plays in the Witney and District Youth Football League.

The annual Middleton Music Festival is an annual a rock music festival, usually held in about the second weekend in July.

Vice-Admiral Holland

Vice Admiral Lancelot Holland (1887–1941) was born in Middleton Cheney. He joined the Royal Navy in 1902 and spent the First World War as a gunnery instructor at HMS Excellent. By 1934 he was a rear admiral, and in 1937 he was aide-de-camp to King George VI.

In the Second World War, Holland commanded the 7th Cruiser Squadron at the Battle of Cape Spartivento in November 1940. The magazine of Holland's flagship  exploded, breaking her in two and sinking her. Holland was killed, along with all but three of Hoods company.

The Admiral Holland pub in Bretch Hill, Banbury, was named after him. The pub was demolished in 2017.

References

Sources

External links

Middleton Cheney village website
All Saints Church website
Middleton Music Festival
Mansion Hill Veterinary Practice

Civil parishes in Northamptonshire
Villages in Northamptonshire
West Northamptonshire District